The Michigan Crossroads Council (MCC) is a local council of the Boy Scouts of America that encompasses the Lower Peninsula of Michigan. The council was formed in 2012 by the merger of nine councils.

History

2012 Merger

The Scouting program in the Lower Peninsula of Michigan saw a drastic drop in membership beginning in the early 2000s. The decrease in population was due to the economy in Michigan and the resulting out-migration of population, jobs and industry. The Area 2 Project was created in 2010 and studied the impact on Scouting and presented the Crossroads Recommendation, which proposed that the ten councils in Michigan merge into one large council.

Erie Shores Council in northwest Ohio voted not to join Area 2 project. Hiawathaland Council in the Upper Peninsula of Michigan, voted against merging into MCC and later merged with the Bay-Lakes Council in Wisconsin.

As a result, in 2012, the remaining Lower Peninsula councils were merged into the Michigan Crossroads Council (MCC).  The MCC is then split into four sub-councils or "Field Service Councils" which are then divided into districts.

Field Service Councils

 Great Lakes Field Service Council
 President Gerald R. Ford Field Service Council
 Southern Shores Field Service Council
 Water & Woods Field Service Council

2020 Merger
In 2020, Michigan Crossroads Council made a decision to merge their Field Service Councils to create one central Council.

Organization
The Organization of the Michigan Crossroads Council Boy Scouts of America councils in Area 2 of the Central Region is unique to Michigan. The Michigan Crossroads Council (MCC) was created by the merger of nine councils in the lower peninsula of Michigan. It is a coordinating council that oversees properties, personnel, and program.

Divisions
As of 2021, Michigan Crossroads council has absorbed it's Field Service Councils and is now divided into two administrative divisions.  These divisions are formally called the President Ford Division, encompassing most of the western counties of Michigan's lower peninsula; and the Great Lakes Division encompassing the lower peninsula's eastern counties.

Districts
President Ford Division
Northern Lights
Scenic Trails
Shoreline
Timber Trails
Heartland
Ojibway
Lakeshore
Eagle Spirit
Chief Okemos
Wabano
Pathfinder
Nottawa Trails

Great Lakes Division
Blue Water
Rivers North
Blue Star
Three Fires
Pontiac-Manito
Chippewa
Ottawa
North Star
Sunrise
Irish Hills
Huron Trails
Sunset
Renaissance
Mahican
Running Waters

Order of the Arrow - Mishigami Lodge 29 

The council is served by the Mishigami Lodge 29. The word Mishigami means "Land of Great Waters" in the Ojibwa language. The lodge uses the Mastodon as its totem. Mishigami Lodge performs service to all Michigan Crossroads Council Camps, hosts fellowship activities, promotes camping among council Boy Scout Troops and Cub Scout Packs, and attends regional and national Order of the Arrow events.

Like all Order of the Arrow programs, the Mishigami Lodge has youth leaders who are advised by appointed adults. The six lodge officers (Chief, Vice-Chief of Program, Vice-Chief of Unit Relations, Vice-Chief of Administration, Treasurer, and Lodge Secretary) are elected annually. The lodge's work is performed by committees which have youth chairmen and adult advisers.

A volunteer Lodge Adviser is appointed by the Scout Executive. The lodge adviser appoints other adults to serve as advisers to specific lodge officers and committees. The Scout Executive also appoints a member of the professional staff to serve a Staff Adviser to the lodge.

Mishigami Lodge 29 is the home lodge of 2021-2022 Section C-2 Chief Daniel Miller.

Camps
All properties in the Michigan Crossroads Council are operated by the council-wide Outdoor Adventures Division. Each year, the Outdoor Adventures Committee assesses the council property and determines which programs each camp will be operating such as resident summer camps, weekend camping, or shooting sports activities. The following is a list of camps that MCC operates:

Resident camps
The following are open in the summer for Cub Scout, Boy Scout, and Venturing resident camps. They are also open for weekend reservations year-round.
 Great Lakes Sailing Adventure, Mackinaw City, Michigan
 Cole Canoe Base, Alger, Michigan
 Camp Rotary, Clare, Michigan
 Gerber Scout Reservation, Twin Lake, Michigan
 D-Bar-A Scout Ranch, Metamora, Michigan
 Camp Teetonkah, Jackson, MI

Closed camps
Since its inception, the Michigan Crossroads Council has closed and sold several camps owned by predecessor councils to balance its finances.
The following camp properties are no longer operated for an indefinite amount of time and are not available for reservations:
 Camp Agawam, Lake Orion, Michigan – returned to Orion Township and now open as park, still used by Scouts
 Camp Holaka, Lapeer, Michigan – sold to developer
 Camp Munhacke, Gregory, Michigan – closed 12/31/19 
 Camp Tapico, Kalkaska, Michigan – sold and now is a nature preserve
 Northwoods Scout Reservation, Lupton, Michigan – sold
 Camp Kiwanis, Mason, Michigan – owned by Saginaw Kiwanis club still run as a camp and available for Scout use
 Lost Lake Scout Reservation, Lake, Michigan – listed for sale
 Paul Bunyan Scout Reservation, Rose City, Michigan – listed for sale
 Rota-Kiwan Scout Reservation, Kalamazoo, Michigan – sold to Kalamazoo County to be used as a park
 Silver Trails Scout Reservation, Jeddo, Michigan – sold to gravel company 
 Camp Greilick, Traverse City, Michigan - now called GO•REC, used for business retreats

References

Local councils of the Boy Scouts of America
Youth organizations based in Michigan
Central Region (Boy Scouts of America)
2012 establishments in Michigan